"Crazy" is a 2004 song recorded by the francophone rapper Cyril Kamar, better known by the name of K.Maro. The song was released as the second single from his debut album La Good Life, on August 5, 2004. The song had a lot of popularity in UK, France, Belgium, Switzerland, Russia and other European countries.

Track listings
 CD single
 "Crazy" — 3:34
 "V.I.P." — 3:44
 "Femme Like U (Donne-moi ton corps)" — 4:06

 CD maxi
 "Crazy" — 3:34
 "Femme Like U (Donne-moi ton corps)" (just another hit mix) — 3:51
 "Walad b'ladi" — 3:43
 "Crazy" (video)

Charts

Weekly charts

Year-end charts

Certifications

References

External links
K.Maro discography

2004 singles
K.Maro songs
2004 songs